Andrey Kvochinsky (born 27 November 1968) is a Belarusian diver. He competed in the men's 10 metre platform event at the 1996 Summer Olympics.

References

1968 births
Living people
Belarusian male divers
Olympic divers of Belarus
Divers at the 1996 Summer Olympics
Sportspeople from Minsk